The  International Socialist Workers and Trade Union Congress held in London from July 26 to August 1, 1896 was the fourth congress of the Second International. The congress has been described as "the  most agitated, the most tumultuous, and the most chaotic of all the congresses of the Second International" because of the many factional disputes between and within the national delegations.

The congress was the only one of the Second International to have its proceedings published in English.  The chairman was Henry Hyndman.

Resolutions 

The Congress passed resolutions on the Agrarian question, political action, education, the position of the working class regarding militarism, the industrial question and the further organization of social democracy. It also passed motions regarding the independence of Cuba, Macedonia and Armenia, tsarism, monarchism, and adopted a special address from the Bulgarian Social Democrats.

References

External links 
Proceedings of the International Worker's Congress, London, July-August, 1896
Rosa Luxemburg, The Polish Question at the International Congress in London
V. I. Lenin on London Congress' resolution on the right of nations to self-determination

History of socialism
Second International
1896 in London
1896 conferences